Belize competed at the 1988 Summer Olympics in Seoul, South Korea. Ten competitors, all men, took part in seven events in two sports.

Competitors
The following is the list of number of competitors in the Games.

Athletics

Men
Track & road events

Field events

Cycling

Five cyclists represented Belize in 1988.

Men

Track cycling
Ranks given are within the heat.

References

External links
Official Olympic Reports

Nations at the 1988 Summer Olympics
1988
Summer Olympics